CSM Suceava, full name Clubul Sportiv Municipal Suceava, was a sports club from Suceava, Romania. It is notable for its football team which played one season in the Divizia A, the highest Romanian league at that time.

History
CSM Suceava was founded on 19 July 1972, incorporating the sections of football, track and field, rugby, and volleyball. During the years, more sections were added and offered to its members, among them archery, baseball, boxing, Greco-Roman wrestling, handball, ice hockey, rowing, speed skating, and swimming. The current setup includes archery, boxing, ice hockey, rugby, track and field, volleyball, and wrestling.

Football
Being one of the founding sections, the football team rose through the ranks of the Romanian league system before eventually gaining promotion to the Divizia A at the end of the 1986–87 season. However, competition there proved to be too strong and relegation back to Divizia B was the logical consequence, a league in which the team played for the rest of its existence. Before the 1993–94 season, the name was changed to Bucovina Suceava, after the name of the region Bukovina.

Bucovina at the end of the 1996–97 season, merged with Foresta Fălticeni, creating the most successful team in the history of Suceava County, the new team being called Foresta Suceava, with the home ground in Suceava, on Stadionul Areni. Bucovina became the second team of Foresta Fălticeni, being called Foresta II Fălticeni, playing his matches on Nada Florilor, Fălticeni.

Chronology of names

In 1957, Flamura Roşie Burdujeni moved to Suceava, becoming Progresul Suceava.

Honours
Liga II
Winners (1): 1986–87
Liga III:
Winners (3): 1965–66, 1970–71, 1972–73
 Runners-up (1): 1971–72

References

External links
 Official website 

Association football clubs established in 1972
Defunct football clubs in Romania
Football clubs in Suceava County
Association football clubs disestablished in 1997
Liga I clubs
Liga II clubs
Multi-sport clubs in Romania